Efaroxan is an α2-adrenergic receptor antagonist and antagonist of the imidazoline receptor.

Synthesis

The Darzens reaction between 2-fluorobenzaldehyde [57848-46-1] (1) and Ethyl 2-bromobutyrate [533-68-6] (2) gives ethyl 2-ethyl-3-(2-fluorophenyl)oxirane-2-carboxylate, CID:100942311 (3). A catalytic hydrogenation over Pd/C would give ethyl 2-[(2-fluorophenyl)methyl]-2-hydroxybutanoate, CID:77591056 (4). Saponification of the ester then gives 2-[(2-Fluorophenyl)methyl]-2-hydroxybutanoic acid, CID:53869347 (5). Treatment with 2 molar equivalents of sodium hydride apparently gives 2-Ethyl-2,3-dihydrobenzofuran-2-carboxylic acid [111080-50-3] (6).

See also
 Fluparoxan
 Idazoxan

References

External links

Benzofurans
Imidazolines
Alpha-2 blockers